The 2022–23 SV Wehen Wiesbaden season is the club's 97th season in existence and the club's third consecutive season in the second flight of German football. In addition to the domestic league, SV Wehen Wiesbaden are participating in this season's edition of the DFB-Pokal. The season covers the period from 1 July 2022 to 30 June 2023.

Players

First-team squad

Out on loan

Pre-season and friendlies

Competitions

Overview

3. Liga

League table

Results summary

Results by round

Matches
The league fixtures were announced on 24 June 2022.

DFB-Pokal

References

External links

SV Wehen Wiesbaden seasons
Wehen Wiesbaden